Jago is a Cornish name most commonly found as a surname, though also used as a forename.  It is derived from the Cornish for the name Jacob or James. The surname dates back to the early 13th century. Jago may refer to:

People

First name
Jago (illustrator) (born 1979), British illustrator
Jago Cooper (born 1977), British archaeologist
Jago Eliot (1966–2006), British artist

Surname
 Becky Jago (born 1976), a British television presenter
 Charles Jago (born 1943), a Canadian historian
 Harry Jago (1913–1997), an Australian politician
 James Jago (1815–1893), a British physician
 Martin Jago (born 1972), a British theatre director and author
 Nick Jago (born 1977), a British musician
 Richard Jago (1715–1781), a British poet
 Valentine Jago (1913–1983), an Irish politician

See also
Iago (disambiguation)

References

External links
 Surname: Jago
 Jago Family Crest
 Jago History Site

Cornish-language surnames